is a Japanese gravure idol and professional wrestler who is represented by the talent agencies, Newgate Production and Ice Ribbon. She was a member of the Ebisu Muscats.

Biography
In 2007, Ando won the Sabra Quasi Grand Prix Award in the "1st Burgaru Championship". She later started gravure activities in the opportunity.

In the same year, during the planning for Dainichi Taisen on Television Saitama, Ando was introduced to professional wrestling organization Ice Ribbon, and on October 20, she debuted with Aoi Kizuki in Ichigaya Ice Box.

On August 23, 2008, she was announced in the Shin-Kiba 1st Ring but later withdrew after the game. At the time Ando was auditioning for Hustle.

In May 2009, she continued idol activities in Fukkatsu! Miniskirt Police.

In mid-2011, Ando left the professional wrestling for entertainment activities. In 2014, she is still in Ice Ribbon as a diva.

During a broadcast of Ōkubo jā Night, Ando confessed that her actual age is 29, and revealed that she had lied about being 2 years younger than she was.

Filmography

TV series

Internet series

Mobile series

Films

References

External links
Official profile 

Japanese gravure models
Japanese female professional wrestlers
1984 births
Living people
People from Tokyo